TVP3 (formerly TVP Regionalna, known also as Regionalna Trójka or Program 3 Telewizji Polskiej) is a Polish TV channel, run by the public broadcaster, TVP and dedicated to the country's regions. It has regional branches in most of the major Polish cities and, similarly to the France 3 in France or Rai Tre in Italy, for couple of hours every day it broadcasts regional programming, including local news and reports.

History
In the beginning, TVP Regionalna existed only as an umbrella brand for TVP regional affiliates. By the late 1990s, all TVP affiliates were connected together into a single national network, producing local news as well as some shows which were broadcast nationwide.
In 2003–2007 from 7:30 to 22:30 it aired nationwide news bulletins every hour. It was also used as the Polish parliamentary channel, transmitting the Sejm meetings, parliamentary inquiry commission's proceedings and other major political events.
In 2005, four new regional bureaus were created by splitting one bureau each from TVP Kraków, TVP Katowice, TVP Gdańsk and TVP Poznań. This move increased the number of bureaus to 16, one for each Polish voivodeship.

In 2007 TVP3 was replaced by TVP Info. This channel has broadcast regional programming (from 17:00 to 20:00 and from 21:45 to 22:15 every day).

On September 1, 2013 local programs were separated from TVP Info and moved to the reactivated TVP Regionalna (from January 2, 2016 under the name TVP3). In fact, TVP3 is not a single channel but sixteen regional channels with local programming (currently from 7:00 to 8:15 and from 17:30 to 22:15 every day). The rest of the schedule fills a common program with magazines, documentaries and current affairs programs.

Its main offices are located at the TVP news compound in central Warsaw. TVP3 can be watched via TV aerial or cable networks and via DVB-T.

All TVP3 channels are not available on the satellite (except TVP3 Warszawa).

Regional branches 

TVP3 Białystok
TVP3 Bydgoszcz
TVP3 Gdańsk
TVP3 Gorzów Wielkopolski
TVP3 Katowice
TVP3 Kielce
TVP3 Kraków
TVP3 Lublin
TVP3 Łódź
TVP3 Olsztyn
TVP3 Opole
TVP3 Poznań
TVP3 Rzeszów
TVP3 Szczecin
TVP3 Warszawa
TVP3 Wrocław

Logos and identities

Telewizja Polska
Television channels and stations established in 1994
Television channels and stations established in 2000
Television channels and stations disestablished in 2007
Television channels and stations established in 2013
Television channels in Poland